Sorkhangi (also Romanized as Sorkhangī; also known as Sorkhang) is a village in Shamil Rural District, Takht District, Bandar Abbas County, Hormozgan Province, Iran. At the 2006 census, its population was 1,190, in 228 families.

References 

Populated places in Bandar Abbas County